Ángel David Alonzo Meneses (born 27 January 2000) is a Mexican professional footballer who plays as a goalkeeper.

International career
In April 2019, Alonzo was included in the 21-player squad to represent Mexico at the U-20 World Cup in Poland.

Career statistics

Club

Notes

References

2000 births
Living people
Association football goalkeepers
Club Necaxa footballers
Liga Premier de México players
People from Teocaltiche
Footballers from Jalisco
Mexican footballers